Pascal Sohm (born 2 November 1991) is a German professional footballer who plays as a midfielder for 3. Liga club Waldhof Mannheim.

Career
Sohm was born in Künzelsau, Baden-Württemberg, and started playing for the FSV Hollenbach first team in 2009. The following year, the team won the Verbandsliga Württemberg and promoted to the Oberliga Baden-Württemberg. There Sohm distinguished himself regularly as a goalscorer in the following three seasons. In the summer of 2013, Sohm moved to SSV Ulm 1846 in the Regionalliga Südwest. There, he immediately established himself as a regular starter and scored six goals in his first season. SSV Ulm were denied a license for the Regionalliga at the end of the 2013–14 season and Sohm moved to Sonnenhof Großaspach, competing in the 3. Liga, after a successful trial. In 2018, Sohm moved to Hallescher FC. In July 2020, he signed with Dynamo Dresden.

On 13 January 2022, Sohm moved to Waldhof Mannheim.

Honours
FSV Hollenbach
Verbandsliga Württemberg: 2009–10

Hallescher FC
Saxony-Anhalt Cup: 2018–19

Dynamo Dresden
3. Liga: 2020–21

References

1991 births
Living people
People from Künzelsau
Sportspeople from Stuttgart (region)
Footballers from Baden-Württemberg
German footballers
Association football midfielders
SSV Ulm 1846 players
SG Sonnenhof Großaspach players
Hallescher FC players
Dynamo Dresden players
SV Waldhof Mannheim players
Regionalliga players
3. Liga players
2. Bundesliga players
Oberliga (football) players